Henry Clay Frick II (October 18, 1919 – February 9, 2007) was an American physician and professor of medicine at the Columbia University College of Physicians and Surgeons.

Biography 
He was born on October 18, 1919, in New York City the son of Childs Frick (1883–1965), the paleontologist, and grandson of his namesake, the coke and steel magnate Henry Clay Frick (1849–1919).

He attended St. Paul's School. In 1942 he graduated from Princeton University and then from the medical school in 1944 at Columbia College of Physicians and Surgeons. After World War II he served in the U.S. Army Medical Corps and became a captain. Frick practiced medicine in New York, and later became a professor of clinical obstetrics at Columbia and an oncologist at Columbia Presbyterian Hospital. During the 1960s he voluntarily served two tours of duty in a field hospital during the Vietnam War.

Frick was a trustee and board president of New York's Frick Collection and chairman of his aunt's Helen Clay Frick Foundation. In this later capacity he directed the restoration, according to his aunt's wishes, of the Frick family's Pittsburgh estate, Clayton. He also was a trustee of the Wildlife Conservation Society and the American Museum of Natural History.

He died at age 87 on February 9, 2007, at his Alpine, New Jersey home.

References

Sources

1919 births
2007 deaths
People from Alpine, New Jersey
American gynecologists
People associated with the American Museum of Natural History
Wildlife Conservation Society people
Princeton University alumni
Columbia University Vagelos College of Physicians and Surgeons alumni
Columbia University faculty
United States Army officers
United States Army personnel of the Vietnam War
Military personnel from New Jersey